Agent Vinod is a 2012 Indian Hindi-language action spy film written and directed by Sriram Raghavan produced by Saif Ali Khan and Dinesh Vijan. The film borrows its name from the 1977 film of the same name, and stars Saif Ali Khan and Kareena Kapoor in the lead roles, while Ram Kapoor, Prem Chopra, Shahbaz Khan and Adil Hussain appeared in prominent roles. Ravi Kishan made a special appearance in the film. 

The film received mixed reviews from critics, who praised the visuals, acting performances, action sequences, songs, cinematography and production values, but criticized the screenplay and writing.

Plot
In the Dasht-E-maadar desert in kotha Afghanistan, inside a Taliban camp, ISI official Col. Huzefa is interrogating a captured man presumed to be a RAW agent. The man gives details of RAW's operations in Afghanistan in exchange for money and safe passage across the border. He betrays his colleague, Major Rajan, who has also infiltrated the camp. This is only a ruse, as both overpower their captors and fight their way out of the camp. Along the way, they rescue a girl called Farah.

In New Delhi, Agent Vinod is show a message from Russia and tasked to find out what '242' is. Vinod travels to St. Petersburg. There he is almost captured, but manages to escape and goes to Tangiers, Morocco. Vinod assumes identity as Freddie and meets mafia boss David Kazan and his personal (Pakistani) doctor, Ruby Mendes. Vinod manages to convince Kazan that he is Freddie Khambatta and hacks Kazan's phone. Vinod gets closer to Ruby to find out what '242' is. Ruby is actually a British-Pakistani working undercover for the ISI. Vinod obtains an invitation card for a private auction and learns that many international terrorist groups are converging at an antiques auction in Marakkesh to purchase '242'. 

At the auction, Vinod learns that '242' is actually the detonator for the nuclear device. A bidding war ensues, and Kazan manages to secure the detonator. It turns out that a group of rogue ISI colonels are planning an attack on India. In Morocco, Kazan locks the detonator with a password, and hands it over to Colonel, who has arrived in Morocco. Iram finds out Vinod is a RAW agent, both agree to work together to prevent the nuclear device from falling into the wrong hands. 'Colonel' captures Ruby and asks her to reveal the whereabouts of Agent Vinod. Vinod is attacked and admitted to a hospital. He clears his way out of the hospital to find Iram. 'Colonel', now having the detonator reaches Riga, Latvia to acquire the bomb. 

Colonel enlists Iram help his men to transport the bomb out of Latvia and tries to kill her, but fails. Vinod and Iram join hands and try to capture the Colonel and the bomb. Iram and Vinod reach Karachi. There, they learn of plot to smuggle the nuclear device from Karachi into India via the sea route and learn that the target of the bomb is New Delhi. They make it to New Delhi and try to locate the bomb. Iram runs into 'Colonel', and is shot, but points him out to Indian security forces, who kill him. Eventually, Vinod tracks down the bomb and takes the bomb up in a helicopter to detonate it as far away from the city as possible. Iram realises the set password to the detonator and asks Vinod to try the name of Kazan's camel-"Zilleh". 

The bomb is defused, but Iram dies of gunshot wounds. Realizing that they have been manipulated into almost starting a war with India, the Lashkar-e-Toiba sends a suicide bomber to assassinate Metla at a function in his honour. Metla is killed, but posthumously feted as a great philanthropist On a beach in Cape Town, the beautiful Russian girl who first acquired the nuclear device is seen sunbathing. She looks up to find Agent Vinod smiling at her. It is apparent Vinod has moved on to his next mission.

Cast
 Saif Ali Khan as Agent Vinod
 Kareena Kapoor as Iram Parveen Bilal / Ruby Mendes
 Adil Hussain as Colonel
 Ravi Kishan as Maj. Rajan(Cameo)
 Prem Chopra as David Kazaan
 Ram Kapoor as Abu Sayed Nazer
 Zakir Hussain as Associate in Tangier
 B. P. Singh as RAW Chief Hasan Nawaz
 Shahbaz Khan as Col. Huzefa Lokha
 Gulshan Grover as Tehmur Pasha(Cameo)
 Dhritiman Chaterji as Sir Jagadishwar Metla
 Rajat Kapoor as ISI Chief Iftekhar Ahmed
 Anshuman Ajai Singh as Jimmy
 Arif Zakaria as the suicide bomber
 Vasilisa Petina as the Mysterious Girl
 Mohommed Ali Shah as Police Inspector
 Rio Kapadia as Alay Khan (Pakistan High Commissioner to India)
 Lalit Parimoo as professor
 K. C. Shankar
 Elena Kazan as Tatiana Renko
Hennie Bosman as Business Man
 Maryam Zakaria as Farah Faqesh and special appearance in song "Dil Mera Muft Ka" 
 Malika Haydon as a special appearance in song "Steal The Night (I'll Do the Talking Tonight)" and "Pungi"

Production
According to Raghavan, Agent Vinod is not a remake of the 1977 action film of the same name. In an interview with Bollywood Hungama, he described it as "a realistic film ... full of action pieces, thrills and characters." On 30 May 2010, the director reported that the film's shoot had officially begun in Mumbai. Filming later continued in Morocco and Latvia.

A Pakistani film maker Iram Parveen Bilal, whom director Sriram Raghavan met at Indian Film Festival Los Angeles, in 2008 was the inspiration behind Kareena's character name. In the beginning of the movie, Agent Vinod mentioned the name of a mole working as a guard at the Taliban camp in Afghanistan as Mahendra Sandhu, which was a reference to the name of the actor who portrayed Agent Vinod in the 1977 film.

Soundtrack
The film's soundtrack has been composed by Pritam. The track I'll Do the Talking Tonight is a partial interpolation of the 1978 song Rasputin, composed by German disco group Boney M which in turn, is interpolated uncredited from Kâtibim, the original Ottoman folk song. According to IBN live, Raabta is the "most beautiful song" of the film. The version of Raabta used in the film is the Night in a Motel version and is incorrectly listed as being sung by Hamsika Iyer when in fact it was Aditi Singh Sharma who sung this song. Moreover, the song Habibi Ya Nour El Ain performed by Alabina, Ishtar was used in a scene background when Agent Vinod and Freddie Khambatta are seen walking out of Morocco Airport. However the song and artist are not credited. The version of Dil Mera Muft Ka used in the film is not available on the soundtrack. Also not available on the soundtrack is the title song seen in the film Govind Bolo Gopal Bolo. Due to "popular demand" it was uploaded on YouTube by T-Series on 29 March 2012.

Release
The film released on 23 March 2012. A few days before release, the film was banned by the Central Board of Film Censors of Pakistan for containing various controversial references to the Pakistani spy agency Inter-Services Intelligence.

Reception

Critical Reception
Kaveree Bamzai of India Today gave the film a mixed review, saying, "If only Sriram Raghavan had not gone weak on his knees at the thought of love, Agent Vinod would have been a smarter, sharper, cooler film." Gaurav Malani of The Times of India called the film "above average" and said "The film is entertaining but not in entirety. Agent Vinod gets the nod though not whole-heartedly!" Blassey Chettiar of Daily News and Analysis rated the film 3 out of 5 stars, saying, "Director Sriram Raghavan (Ek Hasina Thi, Johnny Gaddar) delivers a neat package, a suave lead hero slogging it out in picture-perfect locations, packing punches here and there, zooming off on sexy bikes, sexier cars and finally a copter, all in a day's work." Kunal Guha of Yahoo! rated the film 1 out of 5 stars, saying, "Let's just say foreign locales, weapons to annihilate the world, designer suits and not-so-excruciating interrogations don't cumulatively justify Agent Vinod as a thrilling movie-watching experience." Raja Sen of Rediff gave the film 2.5 out of 5 stars and said, "As a film, Agent Vinod must be termed a disappointment, a slick and well-produced throwback to the spy thriller that feels both overlong and under-conceived.".

Anupama Chopra of Hindustan Times gave 2.5 out of 5 noted "The result is that Agent Vinod never becomes more than the sum of its parts and even though it picks up speed in the second half, it leaves you both exhausted and unsatisfied". Mrigank Dhaniwala of Koimoi gave the film 2 out of 5 stars as well, commenting, "Agent Vinod is a bold experiment gone wrong; certainly not something that entertains in its entirety ... (and) comes nowhere closer to the Bond or the Bourne series of Hollywood films." Zee News commented that, "Agent Vinod is a genuine attempt at entertaining in a sensible manner. But it somehow falls short of being declared as a brilliant piece of work. Watch it for its stylish presentation, it hasn't got anything else to offer." Khalid Mohammed of Deccan Chronicle rated the film 2 out of 5 stars, commenting, "Suggestion: if you do venture into this at best, average Agent Vinod, carry a huge thermos of coffee to stay awake." Rajeev Masand of CNN-IBN rating the film 2/5 feels "Agent Vinod with so many varied influences that it never finds its own distinct identity".

Richard Kuipers of Variety commented that "this big-budget exercise bears all the hallmarks of a franchise-in-waiting; with an injection of the elan the real Maibaum brought to the Bond series, such an enterprise could prove successful". Independent Online from South Africa gives 3.5 out of 5 and says "the film is undeniably a cool and entertaining spy thriller".

Box office
On its opening day, the movie collected  at the box office. Agent Vinod went on to earn a total of  during its first week and  throughout its run. The movie was declared Flop at box office.

Controversies
Before release, Agent Vinod ran into trouble when Saif Ali Khan's brawl with businessman Iqbal Meer Sharma was touted as a publicity stunt for the film. However, Khan has strongly denied the brawl to be such, and said, "I don't believe in garnering publicity in such a negative manner. Rather our posters and promos should create the right kind of buzz".

Khan was shown black flags while promoting the film in Bhopal, which was triggered due to changes brought into administration of the Pataudi family properties in Middle-East.

Iranian band Barobax later sued the film's music director Pritam one week before the release, claiming that he lifted the song, Pyaar Ki Pungi from the former's song, Soosan Khanoom. However, two weeks after the film's release, the band publicly apologised to Pritam and stating both the songs were different, withdrew its court-case.

The film was banned in Pakistan as it made references to a section of ISI's involvement in Jihadi groups and terror activities. To this, Khan responded, "This is a realistic kind of a thriller. We have shown that there are some negative elements in Pakistan towards India and their Censor have a problem showing that. We have shown a few most-wanted criminals, those that are harboured in Pakistan, which is a known fact. May be they have taken offence to that. But ultimately we want a RAW agent to win and baddies to lose. If they are uncomfortable with that then they should publicise the fact that they are banning Agent Vinod in Pakistan".

A week after its theatrical release, Agent Vinod again ran into trouble for plagiarism. Reports said that the film featured songs from older films, without acquiring prior permission from the producers. The songs involved were Aasmaan Pe Hai Khuda from Ramesh Saigal's Phir Subah Hogi (1958), Meri Jaan Maine Kaha from Ramesh Behl's The Train (1970) and Rakamma from Mani Ratnam's Thalapathi (1991). The owners of these songs were not credited in the film. Saif Ali Khan however paid for the rights later, and explained this to be a last-minute co-ordination problem.

Awards and nominations

See also
 Bollywood films of 2012

References

External links
 
 
 
 
 

Indian spy action films
2010s Hindi-language films
Films shot in Morocco
Films shot in Maharashtra
2012 films
Pakistan Navy in fiction
India–Pakistan relations in popular culture
Films shot in Latvia
Films shot in Russia
Films shot in South Africa
Films shot in Delhi
Films shot in Jammu and Kashmir
Films shot in Switzerland
Films shot in England
Films shot in Mumbai
Film censorship in Pakistan
Film controversies in Pakistan
Films featuring songs by Pritam
Indian detective films
2010s spy action films
Films about the Research and Analysis Wing
Censored films
Military of Pakistan in films
Films directed by Sriram Raghavan
Hindi-language action films
Films set in Morocco
Films set in Tangier
Films set in Riga
Films set in Latvia
Films set in Saint Petersburg
Films set in Russia
Films about nuclear technology
Films about nuclear war and weapons